David Hays may refer to:

 David Hays (cricketer) (born 1944), English-born Scottish cricketer
 David G. Hays (1928–1995), linguist, computer scientist and social scientist

See also
 David Hayes (disambiguation)
 David Hay (disambiguation)